Fuyu Kyrgyz may refer to:

 Fuyu Kyrgyz language, a endangered language spoken in China
 Fuyu Kyrgyz people, an ethnic group which live in China